USS LST-548 was a United States Navy  in commission from 1944 to 1946. She also served in a non-commissioned status with the Military Sea Transportation Service as USNS LST-548 (T-LST-548) from 1952.

Construction and commissioning
LST-548 was laid down on 30 December 1943 at Evansville, Indiana, by the Missouri Valley Bridge and Iron Company. She was launched on 22 February 1944, sponsored by Mrs. Robert L. Koch, and commissioned on 3 April 1944.

Service history

In commissioned service
During World War II, LST-548 initially was assigned to the European Theater of Operations. She participated in Operation Overlord, the invasion of Normandy, in June 1944. LST-548 subsequently was assigned to the Pacific Theater of Operations, where she took part in the assault on and occupation of Okinawa Gunto in June 1945.

Following the war, LST-548 performed occupation duty in the Far East until early February 1946, when she returned to the United States.

LST-548 was decommissioned on 15 February 1946.

Non-commissioned service in Military Sea Transportation Service
On 31 March 1952, LST-548 was transferred to the Military Sea Transportation Service, where she served in a non-commissioned status as USNS LST-548 (T-LST-548).

Final disposition
USNS LST-548 was stricken from the Navy List on 1 January 1960. She was sold later that year for $56,000 USD to Coal Export Corporation for scrapping in Japan.

Honors and awards
LST-548 earned two battle stars for World War II service.

References

NavSource Online: Amphibious Photo Archive USNS LST-548 ex USS LST-548 (1944 - 1952)

 

LST-542-class tank landing ships
World War II amphibious warfare vessels of the United States
Cold War amphibious warfare vessels of the United States
Ships built in Evansville, Indiana
1944 ships